Ryan Pivirotto (born May 14, 1995) is an American short track speed skater.

Career
Pivirotto won a bronze medal at the 2020 Four Continents Short Track Speed Skating Championships in the 5000 metre relay.

Pivirotto was named to the roster for the United States at the 2018 Winter Olympics, however, he did not compete in any events. He represented the United States at the 2022 Winter Olympics.

References

1995 births
Living people
American male short track speed skaters
Four Continents Short Track Speed Skating Championships medalists
Olympic short track speed skaters of the United States
Short track speed skaters at the 2022 Winter Olympics
Sportspeople from Ann Arbor, Michigan